Bellari is a Dravidian variety of India spoken by about 1,000 Bellara, a Scheduled Caste of Karnataka and Kerala. It is reportedly close to Tulu and Koraga (especially the former), but it is not known if it is a separate language or a dialect of Tulu. A community of fifty families of basket-weavers lives in Kundapura Taluk in coastal Karnataka.

References 

Dravidian languages
Endangered languages of India